Joe T. Kroeber is a North Dakota Democratic-NPL Party member of the North Dakota House of Representatives, representing the 12th district since 1999. He previously served from 1991 through 1995.

External links
North Dakota Legislative Assembly - Representative Joe Kroeber official ND Senate website
Project Vote Smart - Representative Joe T. Kroeber (ND) profile
Follow the Money - Joe Kroeber
2006 2004 2000 1998 campaign contributions
North Dakota Democratic-NPL Party - Representative Joe Kroeber profile

Living people
People from Jamestown, North Dakota
Year of birth missing (living people)
Democratic Party members of the North Dakota House of Representatives